Liam Ó hAnluain, (1910–1992) was an Irish Christian Brother, schoolteacher, educator, and Irish Language scholar.
Born in Derry city in 1910, educated locally in riverside, then in bunapobail, Co. Donegal. He trained as a christian brother in St. Joseph's Baldoyle completing his secondary education, and as a National School teacher in Colaiste Mhuire/St. Mary's College in Marino. While working as a teacher in North Abbey, Cork, he earned a BSc followed by a BA, and H.Dip in Education, and finally an MSc from University College Cork.

He worked in the St. Mary's Marino, teacher training college. He served as provincial of the christian brothers before stepping down due to ill health. He was tasked with writing a standard format for the grammar of the irish language used in the christian brothers schools.

Publications
 Graiméar Gaeilge na mBráithre Críostar by Liam Ó hAnluain, An Gúm, M.H. Mac an Ghoill agus a Mhac Teo. BAC, 1960.

References

1910 births
1992 deaths
Writers from Derry (city)
Irish Christian Brothers
Irish schoolteachers
Alumni of Marino Institute of Education
Alumni of University College Cork